Paris–Tours is a French one-day classic road cycling race held every October from the outskirts of Paris to the cathedral city of Tours. It is a predominantly flat course through the Chevreuse and Loire valleys; the highest point is 200 m, at Le Gault-du-Perche. It is known as a "Sprinters' Classic" because it frequently ends in a bunch sprint at the finish, in Tours. For several decades the race arrived on the 2.7 km long Avenue de Grammont, one of cycling's best-known finishing straits, particularly renowned among sprinters. Since 2011 the finish was moved to a different location because a new tram line was built on the Avenue de Grammont.

History 
Paris–Tours was first run for amateurs in 1896, making it one of the oldest cycling races in the world. It was organised by the magazine Paris-Vélo, which described that edition won by Eugène Prévost as, "A crazy, unheard of, unhoped for success". It was five years before the race was run again and a further five years (1906) before it became an annual event for professionals, with L'Auto as organiser. L’Auto ran the Tour de France (TDF) and Paris–Tours is still run by the Tour organiser, Amaury Sport Organisation.

The race was part of the UCI Road World Cup from 1989 to 2004, and the UCI ProTour from 2005 to 2007. Since 2008 it is part of the UCI Europe Tour.

The route 
Paris–Tours has had many route changes although the distance has remained about 250 km. The start was moved out of Paris in the early days, first to Versailles, then to at Saint-Arnoult-en-Yvelines. Since 2009, the route has started in the Department of Eure-et-Loir. A loop through Chinon was added between 1919 and 1926 to make the approach to Tours hilly lanes on the south bank of the Loire and the total distance 342 km. Sprinters continued to dominate and in 1959 the organisers added three ascents of the Alouette Hill. It made little difference.

In 1965 dérailleurs were banned and riders were limited to two gears. The race was won by Dutch first-year professional Gerben Karstens who chose 53/16 and 53/15, covering 246 km at a record 45.029 km/h. The experiment was judged a failure when the 1966 race ended the same way as 1964.

The course was reversed and the route constantly changed between 1974 and 1987. It was sometimes known as the Grand Prix d'Automne and sometimes by the names of the start and finish towns. For many the event lost character as the race was run between Tours and Versailles (1974–75) Blois and Chaville (1976–77 and 1979–84), Blois to Autodrome de Montlhéry (1978) and Créteil to Chaville (1985–87). In 1988 the race reverted to its original Paris–Tours route.

The wind can often be hostile; in 1988 Peter Pieters averaged just 34kmh, slowest for 57 years. However, Paris–Tours becomes the fastest classic when the wind is behind the riders, Óscar Freire winning in 2010 at 47.730kmh. It gave him the Ruban Jaune or "Yellow Riband" for the fastest speed in a classic, in fact the Ruban Jaune has been awarded nine times (as of 2016) to riders winning Paris–Tours and posting the fastest time in a professional race.

The route for the 2018 edition of the race was changed radically with the race starting in Chartres and incorporating 12.5 kilometres' of unpaved gravel tracks inside the final 60 kilometres as the race winds it way around vineyards in the Tours area. Seven new punchy climbs were also included in the finale of the race which was reduced to a distance of 211 kilometres to compensate for the additional difficulties.

Classic races and riders 
The 1921 edition had blizzards. Half the field abandoned in Chartres. The winner, Francis Pélissier, punctured late in the race; his hands frozen, he tore the tyre off the rim with his teeth. Riding on the rim, he caught Eugène Christophe and soloed to the finish. Rik Van Looy won the 1959 race, the first to feature the Alouette Hill. One of the best sprinters of his day, Van Looy dropped two others on the second ascent and won alone.

The record for the most victories is three, held by Gustave Danneels (1934, 1936, 1937), Paul Maye (1941, 1942, 1945), Guido Reybrouck (1964, 1966, 1968) and Erik Zabel (1994, 2003, 2005).

Eddy Merckx never won Paris–Tours; he could have triumphed in 1968 but handed victory to teammate Guido Reybrouck, pulling out of the sprint, to thank him for help earlier in the season. Later, Noël Vantyghem (winner of the 1972 edition) said "Together with Eddy Merckx, I won all classics races that could be won. I won Paris-Tours, he the rest."

Erik Zabel took his first big victory at Paris–Tours in 1994. He won Paris–Tours again in 2003 and 2005. Jacky Durand, Andrea Tafi, Marc Wauters, Richard Virenque, Erik Dekker and Philippe Gilbert (two times) have all won solo or from a small group, denying sprinters a chance. Virenque had just returned from a drugs ban. He broke away with Durand shortly after the start and stayed away despite Durand's dropping back outside Tours.

The Autumn Double 
The Autumn Double refers to Paris–Tours and the Giro di Lombardia, considered cycling's most important classics in Autumn, run within a week of each other in October. The races are different – Lombardia is for climbers – making the double difficult. Only four have achieved it in the same year:  Belgians Philippe Thys in 1917 and Rik Van Looy in 1959, Dutchman Jo de Roo twice (1962–1963) and Belgian Philippe Gilbert in 2009.

Results

List of winners

Multiple winners
Riders in italics are still active

Wins per country

Tours–Paris 
In 1917 and 1918 a race was held from Tours–Paris as well as Paris–Tours.

The winners of Tours–Paris were:

Notes

References 
 The Spring Classics: Cycling's Greatest One-Day Races
 European Cycling (The Twenty Greatest Races) – Noel Henderson. 
 A Century of Cycling – William Fotheringham.

External links 
 

 
UCI ProTour races
Classic cycle races
Cycle races in France
Recurring sporting events established in 1896
1896 establishments in France
UCI Road World Cup races
UCI Europe Tour races
Cycling in Paris
Sport in Tours, France
Challenge Desgrange-Colombo races
Super Prestige Pernod races